Shankill is a civil parish and townland (of 173 acres) in County Armagh, Northern Ireland. It is situated in the historic barony of Oneilland East, with one townland in the barony of Iveagh Lower, Upper Half in County Down.

Settlements
The civil parish contains the following settlements:
Lurgan

Townlands
Shankill civil parish contains the following townlands:

Aghnacloy
Ballyblagh
Clanrolla
Cornakinnegar
Demesne
Derry
Dougher
Drumnamoe
Drumnykerne
Killaghy
Kilmore
Knocknashane
Legaghory
Liscorran
Lurgan
Lurgantarry
Monbrief
Shankill
Taghnevan
Tannaghmore North
Tannaghmore South
Tirsogue
Toberhewny
Tullydagan
Tullygally
Tullyronnelly

See also
List of civil parishes of County Armagh

References

 
Townlands of County Armagh